is a former Japanese football player and manager. He is the current head coach of the Cambodia national under-21 football team and Bati Academy.

Playing career
Gyotoku was born January 28, 1965, in Shizuoka Prefecture, Japan. He went to school at Shizuoka Municipal Shimizu Fifth and Tokai Western High School. After high school, he went to Tokai University. Gyotoku began his football career with Werder Bremen II, a team in West Germany. After playing for Werder Bremen II, he went on to play for Toyota Motors. He appeared 13 times for the team, 12 in 1990-91 and 1 in 1991-92, but never scored a goal for the team. It did not make the JSL Cup.

Coaching career
Gyotoku coached the Shimizu S-Pulse in 2003 after Takeshi Oki resigned from his position as team manager
He led the team to the semi-finals of the J.League Cup and the Emperor's Cup, placing them 11th overall in the league. The team went on to make it to the AFC Champions League group stage.

Gyotoku became the coach of the Bhutan national team in 2008. He led the Bhutan team the semifinals of the 2008 South Asian Football Federation Cup tournament, where they lost to India (2 - 1) during stoppage time of extra time. It was the furthest the team had ever gone. In the 2008 and 2010 AFC Challenge Cup he would lead the team to third and fourth place respectively. However, the team did not attempt to qualify for the 2010 World Cup, being the only FIFA member in the 2010 qualifications to withdraw. The cited reason for this was a lack of preparation of the field before their game against Kuwait.

From December 2014 to July 2015, Gyotoku was head coach of Angthong of the Thai Division 1 League. In early 2016, Gyotoku was appointed as head coach of the Nepal national team arriving in the Himalayan country on March 4, 2016. Under Gyotoku's guidance, Nepal performed well and improved its form during the 2019 AFC Asian Cup qualification, with Nepal achieved two respectable draws against eventual debutants Philippines and Yemen at home. But with Gyotoku being found to have entered Nepal with a tourist visa and had no legal working papers permit, he was fired as coach of Nepal in 2018.

Club statistics
Gyotoku played in for each of the schools he attended before he reached the professional level.

Other official game
 1990
 Konica Cup 1 appearance with no goal

Managerial statistics

References

External links

1965 births
Living people
Tokai University alumni
Association football people from Shizuoka Prefecture
Japanese footballers
Japan Soccer League players
Nagoya Grampus players
Japanese football managers
Japanese expatriate football managers
J1 League managers
J2 League managers
Shimizu S-Pulse managers
Japanese expatriates in Bhutan
Expatriate football managers in Bhutan
Bhutan national football team managers
FC Gifu managers
Association football defenders
Japanese expatriate sportspeople in Bhutan
Japanese expatriate sportspeople in Cambodia
Japanese expatriate sportspeople in Nepal
Expatriate football managers in Nepal
Expatriate football managers in Cambodia